Lee Harvey (born 1949) is a former Director of the Centre for Research and Evaluation at Sheffield Hallam University.

In April, 2008 there was controversy as Harvey was suspended from his position by the UK's Higher Education Academy for writing a letter to the Times Higher Education that was critical of the National Student Survey. In May, 2008 he quit his post over the issue.

His work is in the field of higher education policy.

Books

Critical social research (1990), Lee Harvey, Unwim Hyman, 
Transforming Higher Education (1996), Lee Harvey, Peter Knight, Peter T. Knight,  Open Univ Pr,

References

Living people
Academics of Sheffield Hallam University
Academic staff of Copenhagen Business School
British educational theorists
1949 births